USS Hoggatt Bay (CVE-75) was the twenty-first of fifty s built for the United States Navy during World War II. She was named after Hoggatt Bay, which was named in 1895 by Lieutenant commander E. K. Moore after Wilford Bacon Hoggatt, an ensign serving in Moore's party at the time. The bay is located within Baranof Island, part of the Alexander Archipelago, which at the time was a part of the Territory of Alaska. She was launched in December 1943, commissioned in January 1944, and she served in the Mariana and Palau Islands campaign, the Invasion of Lingayen Gulf as a part of the Philippines campaign, as well as the Battle of Okinawa. Post-war, she participated in Operation Magic Carpet, repatriating U.S. servicemen from around the Pacific. She was decommissioned in July 1946, being mothballed in the Atlantic Reserve Fleet. Ultimately, she was broken up in 1960.

Design and description

Hoggatt Bay was a Casablanca-class escort carrier (Type S4-S2-BB3), the most numerous type of aircraft carriers ever built,  and was designed specifically to be mass-produced using prefabricated sections, in order to replace heavy early war losses. She was based on a heavily modified P1 hull, which was standardized with all of her sister ships. Four Babcock & Wilcox boilers powered two Skinner Unaflow reciprocating steam engines, which drove two screws, providing , thus enabling her to make . Her compact size necessitated the installment of an aircraft catapult at her bow, and there were two aircraft elevators to facilitate movement of aircraft between the flight and hangar deck: one each fore and aft.

One /38 caliber dual-purpose gun was mounted on the stern. Anti-aircraft defense was provided by eight Bofors  anti-aircraft guns in single mounts, as well as twelve Oerlikon  cannons, which were mounted around the perimeter of the deck. By the end of the war, Casablanca-class carriers had been modified to carry thirty  Oerlikon cannons, and the amount of Bofors  guns had been doubled to sixteen, by putting them into twin mounts. These modifications were in response to increasing casualties due to kamikaze attacks. Casablanca-class escort carriers were designed to carry 27 aircraft, but the hangar deck could accommodate more. During the Mariana and Palau Islands campaign and the Invasion of Lingayen Gulf, she carried 16 FM-2 Wildcat fighters and 12 TBM-1C Avenger torpedo bombers for a total of 28 aircraft.

Construction
Her construction was awarded to Kaiser Shipbuilding Company, Vancouver, Washington under a Maritime Commission (MC) contract, on 18 June 1942. The escort carrier was laid down on 17 August 1943 under the name Hoggatt Bay, as part of a tradition which named escort carriers after bays or sounds in Alaska. She was laid down as MC hull 1112, the twenty-first of a series of fifty Casablanca-class escort carriers. She received the classification symbol CVE-75, indicating that she was the seventy-fifth escort carrier to be commissioned into the United States Navy. She was launched on 4 December 1943 and sponsored by Mrs. Esther Irene Sundvik, the wife of a Victor Sundvik, a shipwright at the yard; transferred to the Navy and commissioned on the morning of 11 January 1944, with Captain William Vincent Saunders in command.

Service history

Upon being commissioned, Hoggatt Bay spent the month of January undergoing outfitting at U.S. Naval Ship Yard Tongue Point, Astoria, Oregon. She then underwent a shakedown cruise down the West Coast, heading to Naval Air Station North Island, San Diego, California. She arrived at San Diego on 23 February, and spent the early half of March conducting gunnery and air-defense drills off of the California coast. She left San Diego on 10 March, ferrying a complement of aircraft and passengers to Pearl Harbor, arriving on 16 March, returning to the West Coast on 25 March, where she took on her aircraft contingent, Composite Squadron (VC) 14, on 26 March. On 27 March, aircraft operations began, with Saunders making the first landing. She spent April undergoing an overhaul, heading westwards on 1 May to conduct antisubmarine operations around the vicinity of Emirau Island in the Bismarck Archipelago.

Marianas and Palau Islands campaign

Stopping at Pearl Harbor on 8 May, Hoggatt Bay then proceeded for Majuro Atoll in the Marshall Islands on 11 May, assigned to Escort Division (CortDiv) 39, otherwise known as Task Unit 16.14.6. En route, her aircraft spotted a possible submarine signature on 16 May, which they attacked with little apparent result. She moored at Majuro from 17 to 21 May, before departing on 22 May to be a part of an antisubmarine patrol, operating south of Truk Atoll of the Caroline Islands. By 26 May, when Hoggatt Bay rendezvoused with the division, it had already sunk five Japanese submarines, four of them from the NA line. With Hoggatt Bays escorting destroyers joining in, the group formed Task Group 30.4, a dedicated antisubmarine hunter-killer formation. On the early morning of 31 May, the   claimed her sixth submarine kill in thirteen days.

On 3 June, Task Group 30.4 moored at Manus in the Admiralty Islands to restock and replenish. Putting back to sea on 4 June, the task group received an aerial contact of a surfaced submarine to the north of its search area on 8 June. Taylor dropped two depth charges, and at 15:41, the submarine surfaced  in front of the destroyer. It was quickly engaged by Taylors guns, with the submarine sustaining heavy damage before diving again at 15:46. After another round of depth charges, two large underwater explosions were heard at 15:58, with a large air bubble rising up to the surface afterwards, confirming the submarine's destruction.

On 19 June, Hoggatt Bay returned to Manus, before proceeding to Eniwetok in the Marshalls, staying there for a period of four days to replenish. On 1 July, the escort carrier set out to conduct another antisubmarine patrol. The   and the Buckley-class  were dispatched to investigate, with Wyman receiving a clear sonar contact. As the destroyer escorts dropped their second round of depth charges, a large explosion was felt, shattering I-5, the force of which shattered the lights on Wyman as she went in for a third round.

After replenishing at Eniwetok from 22 to 25 July, Hoggatt Bay set out for her third antisubmarine patrol on 26 July. The surfacing may have been accidental, or the submarine's crew may have been unaware of its position, as no personnel were observed manning the deck guns throughout the course of the engagement. Wyman and Reynolds were sent to intercept the submarine, with Wyman turning to fire its guns, shelling the submarine for a period of two minutes, whilst Reynolds charged in to drop depth charges, a procedure that was halted due to Wymans precise battery. As Reynolds approached and the submarine sank below the surface, a series of explosions were heard, and an oil slick formed at the surface.

The task group was assigned to antisubmarine operations protecting the various ships that were engaged in the Battle of Peleliu and the Battle of Angaur, a task which it conducted through September and October. As the destroyer escort closed to within , the submarine dove, and thirteen minutes later, having established sonar contact, Samuel S. Miles fired her first volley using her Hedgehog mortars. Following the second run, a series of three large explosions rocked the destroyer escort, communicating the submarine's destruction.

Philippines campaign

Hoggatt Bay replenished at Manus from 9 to 12 October, before departing for Palau. Hoggatt Bay and her escorts served as a deterrent against submarine attack, and was credited with thwarting at least one attempt to strike the damaged cruisers.

After spending the latter half of October and the beginning of November undergoing replenishment and maintenance at Ulithi, she spent November providing an air screen and conducting antisubmarine patrols for ships operating in support of the ongoing Battle of Leyte. On 29 November, whilst moored at Manus, VC-14 was rotated off the carrier, and Composite Squadron (VC) 88 came aboard the carrier. She spent December conducting amphibious exercises in Huon Gulf in preparation for the planned Invasion of Lingayen Gulf, a task assigned to Task Force 77, which Hoggatt Bay joined at Manus. On 22 December, Captain Josephus Asa Briggs assumed command of Hoggatt Bay whilst she was replenishing at Manus. On 27 December, Hoggatt Bay, as well as the rest of Task Force 77, left Manus for Luzon. Pausing at Kossol Roads on 31 December, the formation saw its first of many kamikaze attacks on 3 January 1945, with a plane shot down just  from Hoggatt Bay.

As the kamikaze threat intensified, Hoggatt Bays fighters were scrambled almost constantly. However, it was not until 13 January that she found herself directly menaced, after a kamikaze, aiming for her sister ship  and dissuaded by heavy anti-aircraft fire, switched its destination for Hoggatt Bay. As it dove, it was greeted by a direct hit from her 5-inch gun, which tore the plane into shreds. After arriving in Lingayen Gulf on 6 January, the air contingent of Hoggatt Bay began conducting close air support for the landing infantry. On 15 January, an Avenger, piloted by VC-88's commander, Lieutenant commander E. N. Webb, found itself unable to release one of its  bombs during a close air support mission. As the Avenger came to a stop on Hoggatt Bays flight deck, the bomb detonated, killing thirteen onboard and wounding fourteen others. A fire broke out, but was quickly extinguished. Harder to remedy was the noticeably concave flight deck, but nonetheless, flight operations resumed within three hours.

Battle of Okinawa

Hoggatt Bay was ordered to retire to Ulithi on 17 January, arriving on 23 January. There, her aircraft contingent was detached, and she was sent back to the West Coast for further repairs, overhaul, and conversion into a proper flagship, arriving back at San Diego on 15 February. On 2 April, Rear Admiral Harold M. Martin, commander of Carrier Division 23, raised his flag over the vessel. On 6 April, she departed the West Coast for Pearl Harbor, arriving on 13 April. There, she took on a load of aircraft and vehicles, which she unloaded at Guam in the Mariana Islands on 28 April. On 1 May, she embarked Composite Squadron (VC) 99 at Saipan, and after a short period of exercises, she departed on 8 May for Okinawa, in support of the ongoing battle.

On 12 May, Hoggatt Bay commenced air operations over southern Okinawa, conducting a variety of services, such as providing air screening, photographic reconnaissance, supply drops for isolated units, as well as generalized close air support. She kept up this work throughout May and June, with only brief stops at Kerama Retto for replenishment. On 7 June, Hoggatt Bay was attributed with shooting down a kamikaze gunning for her sister ship . By the time Hoggatt Bay had retired from operations on 24 June, VC-99 had conducted 1,327 sorties, dropped  of bombs, and fired more than a thousand rockets.

Post-war

Hoggatt Bay arrived at Leyte on 27 June, where she replenished and restocked. After conducting some training exercises off Samar from 17 to 21 July, she left for Adak, Alaska on 11 August to join Vice Admiral Frank Jack Fletcher's Ninth Fleet, which was operating off of the Aleutian Islands. En route, on 15 August, news of the Surrender of Japan reached the ship. She moored at Kuluk Bay from 18 to 30 August, before departing on 31 August for Mutsu Bay, where Fletcher received the formal surrender of Japanese forces in northern Honshu and Hokkaido on 6 September. Arriving on 7 September, Hoggatt Bay conducted air patrols and dropped supplies for American ex-prisoners of war. On 14 September, Captain Frederick Norman Kivette took over command of the vessel.

On 15 September, Lieutenant Colonel James Devereux, who had received a Navy Cross for his conduct during the Battle of Wake Island, was taken onto Hoggatt Bay, where he was expeditiously airlifted back to the United States. On 18 September, she rode out Typhoon Ida, and for the latter half of September, she covered the landings of contingents of the Eighth Army in Aomori. She then proceeded southwards into Tokyo Bay on 28 September, where Rear Admiral Martin departed the ship. She left Tokyo Bay on 29 September, escaping the path of Tropical Storm Kate. She entered Apra Harbor on 4 October, and was at Pearl Harbor by 14 October. She arrived at San Francisco on 21 October, where her aircraft contingent, VC-99, was detached. The following day she put into Richmond, where she was assigned to the Operation Magic Carpet fleet, which repatriated U.S. servicemen from throughout the Pacific. At Richmond, conversion into a troopship went into effect, with 704 bunk beds being installed within her hangar deck.

Hoggatt Bays first Magic Carpet trip began on 3 November, when she headed westwards, bound for Pearl Harbor. Midway through, her destination changed to Saipan, and she ferried approximately 1200 passengers back to the West Coast, sailing into San Pedro on 7 December. Her second  trip started on 13 December, arriving at Buckner Bay on 1 January 1946. Taking on some more passengers at Guam on 13 January, she steamed into San Francisco on 28 January. There, on 30 January, Captain Marvin Pabodie Evenson took over command of the vessel. Whilst moored at San Francisco, she was discharged from the Magic Carpet fleet, and assigned to join the Atlantic Reserve Fleet. She took on five SB2C Helldiver dive bombers and four F4U Corsair fighters, as well as 450 marines at San Francisco, and sailed for San Diego on 11 February. She unloaded her cargo on 12 February, where another load of aircraft was taken on. After transiting the Panama Canal, she unloaded her aircraft at Jacksonville, Florida on 7 March. She then proceeded northwards, stopping at Norfolk, Virginia on 17 March, before entering Boston, Massachusetts on 20 March.

After arriving, Hoggatt Bay was decommissioned and mothballed on 20 July 1946, joining the Boston group of the Atlantic Reserve Fleet, mooring at the South Boston Naval Annex. On 12 June 1955, she was redesignated as a helicopter aircraft carrier, receiving the hull symbol CVHE-75. On 7 May 1959, she was further redesignated as an aviation transport, receiving the hull symbol AKV-25. She was struck from the Navy list on 1 September 1959, and she was sold for scrapping on 31 March 1960. She was ultimately broken up in Bilbao, Spain during May 1960. Hoggatt Bay received five battle stars for her World War II service.

References

Sources

Online sources

Bibliography

External links 

 

Casablanca-class escort carriers
World War II escort aircraft carriers of the United States
Ships built in Vancouver, Washington
1943 ships
S4-S2-BB3 ships